Partha Pratim Bora also Known as Barood is an Indian politician, Youth Leader from Sonitpur, Assam. He was the Former President Assam NSUI, Spokesperson and Secretary of the Indian National Congress. Presently State Spokesperson of Asom Gana Parishad

Early life
Partha Pratim Bora was born in Tezpur, Assam to the former Chairmen of Tezpur Mahkuma Parishad, Former State Vice President of Indian Youth Congress and Leader of Indian National Congress Late Prassana Bora and Late Pronati Bora a School Teacher. He lost his parents at an early age in two different accident. Bora completed his primary education in Jamugurihat and move to Delhi for his high schooling in 1997. He was also the First elected State President of the Assam State NSUI, the National students wing of The Indian National Congress.

Political career
Partha Pratim Bora was the secretary of the NSUI Assam state Unit. He then elected the State President of the National Students Union of India,

He was the former Spokesperson and Secretary of Assam Pradesh Congress Committee. After political disagreements with the Congress party, Bora resigned from all positions in April 2022. He joined Asom Gana Parishad on 18 April 2022 at the AGP Office, Guwahati.

References 

Indian National Congress politicians
1989 births
Living people